Intimacy is a 2001 erotic drama film directed by Patrice Chéreau from a screenplay he co-wrote with Anne-Louise Trividic, based on stories by Hanif Kureishi (who also wrote a novel of the same title). It stars Kerry Fox and Mark Rylance. The film is an international co-production between France, the United Kingdom, Germany and Italy, featuring a soundtrack of pop songs from the 1970s and 1980s. Intimacy contains an unsimulated fellatio scene by Fox on Rylance. A French-dubbed version features voice actors Jean-Hugues Anglade and Nathalie Richard.

The film has been associated with the New French Extremity.

Plot
Jay is a bartender who abandoned his family because his wife lost interest in him and their relationship. Now living alone in a decrepit house, he has casual weekly sex with an anonymous woman, whose name he does not know. At first, their relationship is purely physical, but he eventually falls in love with her.

Wanting to know more about her, Jay follows her across the streets of London to the grey suburbs where she lives. He then follows her to a pub theatre where she is working as an actress in the evenings. Jay learns that her name is Claire, and she has a husband and a son. Subsequently, it is made clear to Jay that Claire will not leave her family. They meet for a final time and have sex with an intimacy that has been missing during the sex sessions of their previous encounters.

Cast
 Kerry Fox as Claire
 Mark Rylance as Jay
 Susannah Harker as Susan, Jay's wife
 Alastair Galbraith as Victor
 Philippe Calvario as Ian
 Timothy Spall as Andy, Claire's husband
 Marianne Faithfull as Betty
 Fraser Ayres as Dave
 Michael Fitzgerald as bar owner
 Robert Addie as bar owner
 Rebecca Palmer as Pam, girl in squat

Reception
Intimacy was placed at 91 on Slant Magazine'''s best films of the 2000s.

In a 2001 lengthy column for The Guardian, Alexander Linklater described the jealousy he experienced when his partner Kerry Fox took the real-sex role in this movie. Linklater concludes that he accepted the unsimulated oral scene, but he insists that the sexual intercourse is an illusion. Nevertheless, critics have declared its realist tendencies. Linda Williams, for instance, writes that "Intimacy opens with urgent, hurried and explicit penetrative sex" and Tanya Krzywinska writes that in this first scene "the spectator is left in little doubt that penetration has occurred".

In a 2015 interview with The Wall Street Journal, Mark Rylance spoke of his experience on the film. At the time of the film’s release, talk of the film’s unsimulated sex scenes in tabloids added stress on his marriage. Rylance commented, "It soured me on my life two months. It’s my mistake, but I felt Patrice [Chéreau] put undue pressure on me on set to do that. And at that point I didn’t have the confidence as a film actor to say no. Now I think a lot of actors that people say are difficult are actually just being sensible.”

AwardsIntimacy won the Golden Bear for Best Film and the Silver Bear for Best Actress (Kerry Fox) at the Berlin Film Festival in 2001.

See also
 Unsimulated sex

References

 Further reading 

 Frey, Mattias. (2016) Extreme Cinema: The Transgressive Rhetoric of Today’s Art Film Culture. London: Rutgers University Press.
 Krzywinska, Tanya. (2006) Sex and the Cinema. London: Wallflower.
 Palmer, Tim. (2011) Brutal Intimacy: Analyzing Contemporary French Cinema. Middletown, CT: Wesleyan University Press.
 Williams, Linda. (2007) ‘Hard-Core Art Film: The Contemporary Realm of the Senses’, Quaderns portàtils'', (13), pp. 1–20.

External links
 
 
 

2001 films
2001 drama films
2000s English-language films
2000s erotic drama films
Arte France Cinéma films
British erotic drama films
English-language French films
English-language German films
English-language Italian films
2001 independent films
Films about adultery in the United Kingdom
Films about bartenders
Films based on British novels
Films directed by Patrice Chéreau
Films set in London
Films shot in London
Films whose director won the Best Director Lumières Award
French erotic drama films
German erotic drama films
Golden Bear winners
Italian erotic drama films
Louis Delluc Prize winners
StudioCanal films
2000s British films
2000s French films
2000s German films